The People's Palace, formerly Palais d'été ("Summer Palace" of the Governor), is a public building in Algiers. It was first built in the Ottoman era, then became the residence of the Governor of French Algeria, and was the seat of government during the first three years of Independent Algeria (1962-1965). Its current appearance dates of the colonial period. 

The palace is believed to have been first built between 1798 and 1805. It was the country home of Mustapha Khodja el Kheil, a minister of the Dey. It became an army barracks following the French conquest of Algeria, from 1830 to 1846. It was expanded from 1846, and around 1865 was used as the seat of the governor during the summer season. During the winter season, the governor resided in the  also known as Dar Hassan Pacha, on the northern side of Saint-Philip Cathedral (now the Ketchaoua Mosque) in the Casbah of Algiers. 

Its last significant expansion, designed by architect Gabriel Darbéda, was completed in 1919.

Ahmed Ben Bella renamed it and made it the seat of government following the end of the country's war of independence. Following the 1965 Algerian coup d'état, Houari Boumédiène transferred the President's Office to the newly built El Mouradia Palace. The palace has since been used as an official guest house and for various cultural and governmental functions.

See also
 El Mouradia Palace
 Dar Hassan Pacha
 Dar Aziza
 Dar Mustapha Pacha
 Palace of the Dey
 Government Palace (Algiers)

Notes

Presidential residences
Government buildings in Algeria
Buildings and structures in Algiers
Moorish Revival palaces